Landmark Cases in the Law of Tort (2010) is a book edited by Charles Mitchell and Paul Mitchell, which outlines the key cases in English tort law.

Content
The cases discussed are,

 R v Pease (1832): Mark Wilde and Charlotte Smith
 Buron v Denman (1848) Charles Mitchell and Leslie Urano
 George v Skivington (1869) David Ibbetson
 Daniel v Metropolitan Railway Company (1871) Michael Lobban
 Woodley v Metropolitan District Railway Company (1877) Steve Banks
 Cavalier v Pope (1906) Richard Baker and Jonathan Garton
 Hedley Byrne & Co Ltd v Heller & Partners Ltd (1963) Paul Mitchell
 Goldman v Hargrave (1967) Mark Lunney
 Tate & Lyle Food & Distribution Ltd v Greater London Council (1983) J. W. Neyers
 Smith v Littlewoods Organisation Ltd (1985) Elspeth Reid
 Alcock v Chief Constable of South Yorkshire Police (1991) Donal Nolan
 Hunter v Canary Wharf Ltd (1997) Maria Lee
 Fairchild v Glenhaven Funeral Services Ltd (2002) Ken Oliphant

References

See also
Landmark case
Restitution in English law
Landmark Cases in the Law of Restitution (2006) by Charles Mitchell and Paul Mitchell
Landmark Cases in the Law of Contract (2008) by Charles Mitchell and Paul Mitchell
Landmark Cases in Family Law (2011) by Stephen Gilmore, Jonathan Herring and Rebecca Probert
Landmark Cases in Equity (2012) by Charles Mitchell and Paul Mitchell 
Landmark Cases in Land Law (2013) by Nigel Gravells

English tort law
2008 non-fiction books
Law books